Honey Moon Drips is the fifth studio album by The Chain Gang of 1974. The album was released on May 29, 2020 through Fever Ltd.

Background 
Following the release of Felt, Kamtin Mohager spent 2018 working on his side project, Teenage Wrist, where they released their debut studio album, Chrome Neon Jesus. Following a year of touring and support of the album, Mohager released the single "Burn Out" in February 2019. This was lead with singles throughout 2019, including collaborations with Flux Pavilion.

In September 2019, Mohager announced that he was working on a new album that would be released sometime in 2020. The album's name and announcement came on April 15, 2020 with the release of the single "4AM, Still Lonely". Additionally, the 2019 singles “Such A Shame” and “YDLMA”  were included in the album.

Track listing

References

External links 
 

2020 albums
The Chain Gang of 1974 albums